The Odd Job is a 1978 British comedy film starring Monty Python member Graham Chapman. It tells the story of a man named Arthur Harris (Chapman) who is recently abandoned by his wife. He becomes so depressed that he hires an "odd job man" to kill him. Once his wife returns, Harris finds himself unable to cancel the contract.

The concept originated as an episode of the London Weekend Television/ITV series Six Dates With Barker in 1971, with Ronnie Barker as Arthur Harris and David Jason as the Odd Job Man (who plays the same role in the feature film).

The role of the odd job man was originally intended for Chapman's friend, Keith Moon, but Moon was going through alcohol withdrawal at the time and in no real physical shape to play the part, although he did audition. It was shot at Shepperton Studios with location shooting around London.

Cast
Graham Chapman as Arthur Harris
David Jason as The Odd Job Man
Diana Quick as Fiona Harris
Simon Williams as Tony Sloane
Edward Hardwicke as Inspector Black
Bill Paterson as Sergeant Mull
Michael Elphick as Raymonde
Stewart Harwood asa Bernard
Carolyn Seymour as Angie
Joe Melia as Head Waiter
George Innes as Caretaker
James Bree as Mr. Kemp
Zulema Dene as Mrs. Kemp
Richard O'Brien as Batch
Carl Andrews as Taxi Driver
Dave Atkins as Milkman
John Judd as Police Driver
Nick Edmett as Police Constable
Toby Salaman as Barman
Tiny Keeling as Boston Startler
David Hatton as	Old Man
Anthony Milner as	Waiter
Mark Penfold as	Ambulanceman

References

External links 
 
 

1978 films
Atlantic Entertainment Group films
British comedy films
1970s English-language films
Films directed by Peter Medak
Films with screenplays by Graham Chapman
Films scored by Howard Blake
1978 comedy films
Films shot in London
Films shot at Shepperton Studios
Films set in London
1970s British films